Underberg is an administrative town in a dairy and cattle farming community in the Mzimkulu River valley of KwaZulu-Natal, South Africa. It is situated at the foot of the 1,904 m Hlogoma Peak (place of echoes) in the foothills of the southern Drakensberg, KwaZulu-Natal. Underberg was established  in 1917 when the railway from Pietermaritzburg reached the area. It is an important commercial centre for the region's farming industry providing many of the support services. It is also a trading center for people who come down the nearby Sani Pass from Lesotho.

The town also houses provincial offices of the ministries of Social Welfare and Transport, a clinic; as well as the municipal library. The Underberg School offers pre-primary and primary education. Churches in town include the Catholic Church, Congregational Church, The Underberg Baptist Church and Highlands Church International.

Tourism is the second biggest industry in the area, next to farming. The area surrounding Underberg provides a large variety of tourism offerings, as a gateway to the Southern Drakensberg. The Southern Drakensberg Community Tourism Organisation was established by the community in 2007 and serves to promote tourism under the Southern Berg Escape brand. Underberg offers a variety of accommodation and eatery options, mostly of casual nature to suit most tastes.

The Underberg district is, along with Dullstroom, Mpumalanga one of South Africa's premier trout fly fishing destinations. Splashy Fen, an annual outdoor music festival, is held on a farm near Underberg. The internationally acclaimed Sani2C Mountain Bike race held annually starts in Underberg, while the grueling Joberg2C MTB Race passes through along the same route on Day 6 thereof. Paddlers from far and wide gather annually for the Drak Challenge canoe race held on the Mzimkulu river.

References

 Brandon-Kirby, Robert -  Fly-Fishing in Southern Africa
 Nagy, D. De F. (ed) - The First 100 Years of the Underberg-Himeville District 1887-1987

External links

 Southern Berg Escape
 Splashy Fen
 Sani2C MTB Race
 Joberg2C MTB Race
 Drak Challenge Canoe Race
 Underberg School

Populated places in the Dr Nkosazana Dlamini-Zuma Local Municipality